Larry Brown may refer to:

Arts and entertainment
 Larry Brown (musician) (born 1947), American musician, composer and recording engineer
 Larry Brown (author) (1951–2004), American novelist, non-fiction and short story writer
 Larry Bubbles Brown (born 1952), American comedian and actor
 Larry Poncho Brown (born 1962), American artist

Sports

American football 
 Larry Brown (running back) (born 1947), NFL running back in the 1970s
 Larry Brown (tight end, born 1949), NFL tight end in the 1970s and 1980s
 Larry Brown (wide receiver) (born 1963), NFL wide receiver for the Minnesota Vikings
 Larry Brown (cornerback) (born 1969), NFL cornerback and Super Bowl MVP
 Larry Brown (tight end, born 1976), NFL tight end who played with the Tennessee Titans
 Larry Brown (defensive tackle) (born 1984), NFL defensive tackle

Other sports
 Larry Brown (catcher) (1901–1972), American baseball player in the Negro leagues
 Larry Brown (infielder) (born 1940), American Major League Baseball infielder
 Larry Brown (basketball) (born 1940), American basketball coach and former player
 Larry Brown (ice hockey) (born 1947), Canadian former ice hockey player
 Larry Brown (athlete) (born 1951), American former sprinter

Others
 Larry R. Brown (1943–2012), American politician
 Larry L. Brown, Kentucky politician

See also
 Laurie Brown (disambiguation)
 Lawrence Brown (disambiguation)